Ranko Borozan (25 July 1933 – 2 April 2020) was a Yugoslav footballer.

Club career
Born in Mostar, he played as a defender in the Yugoslav First League for FK Velež Mostar, FK Partizan, Red Star Belgrade and OFK Belgrade during the 1950s. He played as well with Jedinstvo Zemun in the season 1962–63.

He played for Partizan a total of 43 league matches having scored 3 goals between 1954 and 1957. He played for Red Star a total of 22 league matches between 1957 and 1960. He played half-season for OFK Belgrade, in 1959-60 having played 9 matches and scored twice.

He played with Partizan against Sporting CP in the kick-off match of the European competitions, held in Belgrade on 3 September 1955 for the Champions Cup.

With FK Partizan Borozan won 2 Yugoslav Cups (1954, 1957), with Red Star Belgrade he won 2 Yugoslav Championships (1959, 1960), 2 Yugoslav Cups (1958, 1959) and Danube Cup (1958).

He later played with Red Star Belgrade, and during the winter break of the 1959–60 season, he moved to OFK Belgrade.  His career was interrupted then due to an injury, and despite joining FK Jedinsvo Zemun two years later, he will never really retake his career again. He died on 2 April 2020, aged 86.

International career
He played seven matches for the Yugoslavia U-21 team and played once for Yugoslav B national team.

References

1933 births
2020 deaths
Sportspeople from Mostar
Association football defenders
Yugoslav footballers
FK Velež Mostar players
FK Partizan players
Red Star Belgrade footballers
OFK Beograd players
FK Zemun players
Yugoslav First League players
Yugoslav Second League players